Dallis Kevin Smith (born July 31, 1965) is a former American football defensive back who played for the Seattle Seahawks of the National Football League (NFL). He played college football at Valdosta State University.

After not being selected in the 1987 NFL Draft, Smith signed with the Seahawks. Prior to the start of the 1987 NFL season, he was waived in mid-August. Due to that season's player strike, Smith was signed by the Seahawks as a replacement player, making the team's roster for their October 4 game against the Miami Dolphins. Some sources indicate he played in, and started, three games for the 1987 Seahawks.

Smith played high school football at Westover Comprehensive High School in Albany, Georgia. As of 2004, he was coaching high school basketball there, a position he still held in 2013.

References 

1965 births
Living people
American football defensive backs
Valdosta State Blazers football players
Seattle Seahawks players
African-American players of American football
African-American basketball coaches
20th-century African-American sportspeople